The 2021 São Paulo Grand Prix (officially known as the Formula 1 Heineken Grande Prêmio de São Paulo 2021) was a Formula One motor race, held on 14 November 2021 at the Interlagos Circuit in São Paulo, Brazil. The race was the 19th round of the 2021 Formula One World Championship. The event marked the 49th edition of the Grand Prix and the first time the event was known as the São Paulo Grand Prix, with previous editions being known as the Brazilian Grand Prix. Lewis Hamilton won the race.

Background 

The race marked its debut in the Formula One Championship calendar under the name São Paulo Grand Prix, with previous editions being known as the Brazilian Grand Prix. In November 2020, a deal was signed which would see Formula One continue to race at Interlagos until 2025, albeit under the title of São Paulo Grand Prix. The governing body, the FIA lifted the curfew on that limits overnight working after weather conditions meant the equipment arrived late to the venue. This is the 38th time that Interlagos has been visited by the championship. The race was originally to take place on this date, but it was firstly rescheduled to 7 November due to the postponement of the Australian Grand Prix; then it was rescheduled again to its original date due to the reduction of the overall number of Grands Prix in the calendar, from 23 to 22.

Championship standings 
Heading into the race Max Verstappen led the World Drivers' Standings with 312.5 points, 19 points ahead of second-placed Lewis Hamilton. Valtteri Bottas was in third on 185 points, too far behind Verstappen to be able to win the title, but 20 points ahead of Sergio Pérez in fourth with Lando Norris fifth on 150 points. In the World Constructors' Standings, Mercedes led with 478.5 points, one point ahead of second-placed Red Bull Racing. Ferrari were third with 268.5 points ahead of McLaren on 255. Alpine and AlphaTauri were fifth and sixth with 106 points each, with Alpine being ahead courtesy of a win, compared to no wins for AlphaTauri.

Entrants 

The drivers and teams were the same as the season entry list with no additional stand-in drivers for the race or practice.

Tyre choices 
Sole tyre supplier Pirelli allocated the C2, C3, and C4 compounds of tyre to be used during this Grand Prix weekend.

Practice 
The weekend saw two practice sessions, each lasting one hour. The first took place on 12 November at 12:30 local time (UTC-3) and the second took place at 12:00 on 13 November.

Qualifying 
Qualifying took place at 16:00 on 12 November, with the results determining the starting order for sprint qualifying.

Post-qualifying 
After the qualifying session, Hamilton was referred to the stewards for an alleged technical infringement. The technical delegate's report stated that Hamilton's drag reduction system's opening slot was larger than the permitted . The rear wing assembly of Hamilton's car was removed and impounded pending investigations. He was later disqualified from qualifying, forcing him to start at the back of the grid for the sprint qualifying.

Verstappen was referred to the stewards for an alleged violation of article 2.5.1 of the FIA International Sporting Code, after he appeared to have touched Hamilton's car during parc fermé. Verstappen received a €50,000 fine.

Qualifying classification 

Notes
  – Lewis Hamilton qualified first, but was disqualified because his DRS was found not to be in conformity with the rules. He was allowed to race in the sprint qualifying at the stewards' discretion.

Sprint qualifying 
Sprint qualifying took place on 13 November at 16:30 and was contested over 24 laps, with the results determining the starting order for the race.

Sprint qualifying classification 

Notes
  – Lewis Hamilton received a five-place grid penalty for exceeding his quota of internal combustion engines (ICE).
  – Kimi Räikkönen qualified 18th, but was required to start the race from the pit lane due to a rear wing assembly change under parc fermé conditions.

Race 
The race was won by Hamilton, with Verstappen and Bottas completing the podium, and Pérez setting the fastest lap.

Race classification 

Notes
  – Includes one point for fastest lap.

Championship standings after the race

Drivers' Championship standings

Constructors' Championship standings

 Note: Only the top five positions are included for both sets of standings.
 Bold text indicates competitors who still had a theoretical chance of becoming World Champion.

Notes

References

External links 

São Paulo
2021 in Brazilian sport
November 2021 sports events in South America
Brazilian Grand Prix